Celatoxia is a genus of butterflies in the family Lycaenidae. The species of this genus are found in the Indomalayan realm and the Palearctic realm (Yunnan, Himalayas).

Species
Celatoxia albidisca (Moore, 1884) South India (highlands) 
Celatoxia carna (de Nicéville, 1895) Assam to Malaya, Sumatra 
Celatoxia marginata (de Nicéville, 1884) Kumaon, Assam, Himalayas to Burma, North Thailand, Laos, North Vietnam, Yunnan, Formosa Peninsular Malaya

External links
"Celatoxia Eliot & Kawazoé, 1983" at Markku Savela's Lepidoptera and Some Other Life Forms